Predators, sometimes mislabeled as Robert Rodriguez presents Predators, is a real-time strategy tie-in to the Predator franchise, based on the 2010 film of the same name. The game was developed by independent game developer Angry Mob Games and was released for iOS on July 1, 2010, over a week before the film's theatrical release. The game was later ported to Android and published by Fox Digital Entertainment in 2012.

Reception

The iOS version received above-average reviews according to the review aggregation website Metacritic.

References

External links
 

2010 video games
Android (operating system) games
IOS games
Predator (franchise) games
Real-time strategy video games
Video games based on films
Video games developed in Romania